The 2015 South Holland District Council election took place on 7 May 2015 to elect members of the South Holland District Council in England. It was held on the same day as other local elections.

Results

Council composition
Following the last election in 2011, the composition of the council was:

After the election, the composition of the council was:

LI - Lincolnshire Independents

Ward results

Crowland and Deeping St Nicholas

Donington, Quadring and Gosberton

Fleet

Gedney

Holbeach Hurn

Holbeach Town

Long Sutton

Moulton, Weston and Cowbit

Pinchbeck and Surfleet

Spalding Castle

Spalding Monks House

Spalding St. Johns

Spalding St. Marys

Spalding St. Pauls

Spalding Wygate

Sutton Bridge

Brewis was previously elected as a Lincolnshire Independent.

The Saints

Whaplode and Holbeach St. Johns

References

2015 English local elections
May 2015 events in the United Kingdom
2015
2010s in Lincolnshire